Hotel Vast Horizon is the ninth album by singer-songwriter and guitarist, Chris Whitley. It is his seventh studio album.

It was produced by Heiko Schramm, Chris Whitley, Matthias Macht, and Edgar M. Röthig. The album was recorded by Röthig at Helicopter Studio in Dresden, Germany.

"Breaking Your Fall" won Best Folk/Singer-Songwriter Song at the 3rd Annual Independent Music Awards.

Track listing
All tracks written by Chris Whitley unless otherwise noted:

 "New Lost World" – 4:24
 "Breaking Your Fall" (Chris Whitley, Warner Poland, Kai-Uwe Kohlschmidt) – 3:23
 "Frontier" – 4:43
 "Hotel Vast Horizon" – 3:54
 "Blues for André" – 2:52
 "Assassin Song" – 3:56
 "Wide Open Return" – 3:06
 "Silhouette" – 4:26
 "Insurrection at Newtown" – 3:33
 "Free Interval" – 2:40

Trivia 
Part of a song verse in "Hotel Vast Horizon" references 'The Castle of the Poor', by French poet, Paul Éluard.
"Blues for André" refers to French writer, poet, and surrealist theorist, André Breton.

Personnel 
Chris Whitley – vocals, guitar, and banjo
Heiko Schramm – electric bass and acoustic bass
Matthias Macht – drums and percussion

References

2003 albums
Chris Whitley albums
Messenger Records albums